Michael Wagner may refer to:

 Michael Wagner (footballer, born 1975), Austrian footballer
 Michael Wagner (footballer, born 2000), German footballer
 Michael Wagner (writer) (1947–1992), television writer and producer
 Michael J. Wagner (1941–2014), American politician and businessman
 Mike Wagner (born 1949), former American football player 
 Mike Wagner (musician) (born 1975), American musician and producer